Sprengelia montana is a species of flowering plant of the family Ericaceae, and is endemic to Tasmania. It is a small, erect shrub with overlapping, stem-clasping, egg-shaped leaves, and pink flowers, sometimes in groups of up to 10 on the ends of branches.

Description
The flowers are arranged singly, in pairs or groups of up to 10 in crowded heads on the ends of branches, with egg-shaped bracts at the base. Flowering occurs from November to January. This species is similar to Sprengelia incarnata, but has spreading anthers, unlike those of S. incarnata.

Taxonomy
Sprengelia montana was first formally described in 1810 by Robert Brown in Prodromus Florae Novae Hollandiae et Insulae Van Diemen. The specific epithet (montana) means "pertaining to a mountain".

Habitat and distribution
This sprengelia is moderately common in alpine and subalpine areas of Tasmania, including on Ben Lomond, the Central Highlands and the Southern Ranges, where it grows in moist areas, often with or near cushion plants.

References

Epacridoideae
montana
Ericales of Australia
Flora of Tasmania
Plants described in 1810
Taxa named by Robert Brown (botanist, born 1773)